= Oceanian diaspora =

Spread of people with Oceanic heritage

Map of Oceania

The Oceanian diaspora is the group of people living outside of Oceania whose ancestors migrated from Oceania. The term can also refer to groups who have migrated between the islands of Oceania.

== History ==
In ancient times, the many islands of Oceania maintained contact with one another through sailing networks. During the colonial era, this intermigration reduced, as colonisers needed Oceanian populations for labour purposes. In the modern era, the diaspora has largely drifted towards the industrialised nations of the Pacific (such as Australia and New Zealand), though maintaining its cultural and family ties with its ancestral homelands.

The Oceanian diaspora's migration has been induced partly by climate change-related issues that are playing out on various islands, and it has played a significant role in advocating for policies to address climate change.

== In popular culture ==
- Moana is an animated film about a girl who leaves her island to address environmental problems.
